To the Aid of Falx is an adventure module published in 1982 for the Advanced Dungeons & Dragons fantasy role-playing game.

Plot summary
To the Aid of Falx is an adventure in which the player characters help a silver dragon by bringing back five potions of silver dragon control hidden in a thieves' lair.

Publication history
R-1 To the Aid of Falx was written by Frank Mentzer, with art by Jim Holloway, and published by TSR/RPGA in 1982 as a 16-page booklet with an outer folder. The module was a limited edition, and was only available for purchase to RPGA members. It was later rewritten, and collected with the other modules from the R-series in I12 Egg of the Phoenix.

Reception

Reviews

References

Dungeons & Dragons modules
Role-playing game supplements introduced in 1982